Evonne Cawley, Helen Gourlay-Cawley, Mona Guerrant and Kerry Reid were the reigning champions. None of them competed.

Seeds

Draw

External links
 1978 Australian Open – Women's draws and results at the International Tennis Federation

Women's Doubles
Australian Open (tennis) by year – Women's doubles